The Cuban dry forests are a tropical dry forest ecoregion that occupies  on Cuba and Isla de la Juventud.  The ecoregion receives  of rainfall annually.  Cuban dry forests can be differentiated into evergreen forests, semi-deciduous forests, mogotes, and sclerophyllous low forests.

Evergreen forests
Less than 30% of all trees lose their leaves in evergreen forests, and there are few epiphytes or lianas. It is classified according to leaf length as being either mesophyllous (leaves ) or microphyllous (leaves ). Yaya (Oxandra lanceolata), Wallenia laurifolia,  (Trophis racemosa) and Ficus species grow in the lower layer. Microphyllous evergreen forest establishes itself over coastal limestone. Trees include júcaro espinoso (Bucida molinetii), cúrbana (Canella winterana), guayacán negro (Guaiacum sanctum), yaití (Gymnanthes lucida), cerillo (Hypelate trifoliata), soplillo (Lysiloma latisiliquum), guao de costa (Metopium toxiferum), almácigo (Bursera simaruba), caguairán amarillo (Hymenaea torrei), uvillón (Coccoloba diversifolia), and miraguanos (Coccothrinax spp.). Tuna (Opuntia stricta) is an important understory species.

Semi-deciduous forests
About half of the trees in semi-deciduous forests are evergreen, along with shrubs, epiphytes, a few herbaceous plants, and many vines. The lower arboreal story includes deciduous and sclerophyllous evergreen trees. Soils are either red rendzinas, black rendzinas, or brown soils. Trees grow rapidly due to heavy rainfall during the summer. Forests with fluctuating moisture have an  canopy, an understory of microphyllous and thorny deciduous species, and a forest floor covered in herbaceous geophytes.

Mogotes

Mogotes are conical mountains composed of karstic limestone and are found in western Cuba. Plant life includes  (Gaussia princeps),  (Thrinax morrisii),  (Tabebuia calcicola),  (Erythrina cubensis), Malpighia roigiana,  (Microcycas calocoma), Lantana strigosa, Agave spp., and Leptocereus spp. The vegetation on rock faces is bushy and very open and includes shrubs and trees with specially adapted roots, such as the endemic  (Pachira emarginata).

Sclerophyllous low forests

Sclerophyllous low forests are found growing on serpentine soils and represent the transition between the dry forests and xeric scrublands. This is subdivided into charrascales (wet sclerophyllous low forests) and cuabales (dry sclerophyllous low forests). Emergent trees can be found. Plant life includes l (Leucocroton flavicans),  (Annona bullata),  (Bucida molinetii),  (Coccoloba praecox),  (Pseudocarpidium wrightii),  (Copernicia spp.),  (Coccothrinax spp.), Buxus spp. Bourreria spp.,  (Tabebuia spp.), Guettarda spp., Rhodogeron coronopifolius and agave cajalbanensis.

Fauna
Birds of the dry forests include the West Indian woodpecker (Melanerpes superciliaris), Fernandina's flicker (Colaptes fernandinae), Cuban green woodpecker (Xiphidiopicus percussus), and blue-headed quail-dove (Starnoenas cyanocephala). Reptiles include anoles, geckos, and the Cuban boa (Epicrates angulifer).  Desmarest's hutia (Capromys pilorides) is a common species of mammal.

References

Neotropical dry broadleaf forests
Ecoregions of the Caribbean
Ecoregions of Cuba

Natural history of Cuba